Eduardo de Medeiros (23 April 1923 – 20 May 2002) was a Brazilian modern pentathlete. He competed at the 1952 Summer Olympics.

De Medeiros died in São Paulo on 20 May 2002, at the age of 79.

References

External links
 

1923 births
2002 deaths
Brazilian male modern pentathletes
Olympic modern pentathletes of Brazil
Modern pentathletes at the 1952 Summer Olympics
Pan American Games silver medalists for Brazil
Pan American Games medalists in modern pentathlon
Modern pentathletes at the 1951 Pan American Games
Medalists at the 1951 Pan American Games
20th-century Brazilian people
21st-century Brazilian people